Where's Wally?, published in the United States and Canada as Where's Waldo?, is the title of the first book in the Where's Wally? series, published in 1987.

In the book, Wally travels to everyday places, where he sends postcards to the reader (which are the pictures in the book), and the reader must locate Wally in the postcard. 

The book became an instant best-seller. 

Where's Wally? was re-released in October 1997 in a special 10th anniversary edition form. 

The location of Wally was changed in each picture and additional characters were added for the reader to find (Woof, Wizard Whitebeard, Wenda, Odlaw, the Wally Watchers, and others).

The Wally series is quite evocative of an earlier children's book titled Where's Wallace? (by Hilary Knight), in which a red-headed orangutan escapes from the zoo and "hides" in highly detailed picture panoramas, including beach, department store, circus, stadium, and museum.

Scenes
 In Town
 On the Beach
 Ski Slopes
 Camp Site
 The Railway Station
 Airport
 Sports Stadium
 Museum
 At Sea
 Safari Park
 Department Store
 Fairground

Challenging Where's Waldo?
The book has been challenged in libraries and schools because of a topless woman near the upper right of the "On the Beach" scene. 

It ranks #87 on the American Library Association's "100 Most Frequently Challenged Books" list
(1990-1999) because of the exposed breast.  

 The woman is wearing a bikini top in the 1997 special edition release.
 A similar incident occurs in "The Campsite" where children open a tent on a man while he is undressing. 
 In the original, although his genitals are blocked from view by his hand, he is clearly naked. In the 1997 special release, however, he is wearing white briefs.
 Another example of this is in a "Sports Stadium" where a man is seen naked, with a number covering his privates. In the special edition, he was given underwear.

References

1987 children's books
BILBY Award-winning works
British children's books
British picture books
Walker Books books
Puzzle books
Where's Wally? books